Mart-e Haq Ali (also Romanized as Mart-e Ḩaq ‘Alī; also known as Ḩaq ‘Alī and Ḩaqq ‘Alī) is a village in Kharqan Rural District, Bastam District, Shahrud County, Semnan Province, Iran. At the 2006 census, its population was 32, in 8 families.

References 

Populated places in Shahrud County